Pseudexomilus fenestratus is a species of sea snail, a marine gastropod mollusk in the family Horaiclavidae, the turrids.

Description
The length of the shell attains 13.8 mm, its diameter 5.4 mm.

Distribution
This marine species occurs off KwaZulu-Natal, South Africa

References

 R.N. Kilburn (1988), Turridae (Mollusca: Gastropoda) of southern Africa and Mozambique. Part 4. Subfamilies Drilliinae, Crassispirinae and Strictispirinae; Ann. Natal Mus. Vol. 29(1) pp. 167–320

External links
  Tucker, J.K. 2004 Catalog of recent and fossil turrids (Mollusca: Gastropoda). Zootaxa 682:1-1295.
 

Endemic fauna of South Africa
fenestratus
Gastropods described in 1988